Richard Rosner may refer to:

Richard Rosner (psychiatrist) (born c. 1941), American forensic psychiatrist
Rick Rosner (born c. 1941), American television writer and producer, creator of CHiPs
Richard G. Rosner (born 1960), American television writer, producer, and high-IQ celebrity